The Lagos - Abeokuta Expressway is an  expressway  connecting Abeokuta, the capital of Ogun State, and Ikeja, the capital of Lagos, Nigeria's largest city.
The Lagos - Abeokuta expressway is Nigeria busiest highway, linking people living in metropolitan and greater Lagos, as well as people from outside the state.
This expressway is the busiest inter-state  and intra-city route in Nigeria and handles more than 250,000 PCUs daily and constitutes one of the largest road networks in Africa. It is part of the Federal Roads Maintenance Agency (FERMA) projects, concerned with road improvement and connectivity between the States of Nigeria.

BRT development
In 2017 the Lagos State government decided to develop and construct a brt lane on the Lagos Abeokuta expressway.  The construction and development of the brt lane is to be in two phases,  the phase I is from Oshodi to Abule egba, while the phase II runs from Abule egba to Ota toll gate which is the boundary between Lagos and Ogun States.
"The regulator of the BRT scheme, the Lagos Metropolitan Area Transport Authority (LAMATA), has boasted that traffic on the heavily congested Oshodi-Iyana-Ipaja-Abule-Egba route would reduce by 40 per cent after the completion of the project." "The passengers estimate on the corridor is about 230,000 per day, but it can go up to 300,000."

Reconstruction
The reconstruction of the expressway was flagged off on May 14, 2018, by Mr . Babatunde Fashola ( SAN) Minister of Power , Works and Housing of the Federal Republic of Nigeria, to help reduce the travel time of hundreds of thousands of commuters. The contract was awarded to Julius Berger Nigeria and Reynolds Construction Company Limited at a sum of ₦22,000,000,000.00, equivalent to $61,380,000.00. Two sections of the expressway will be reconstructed and this includes Section I (Lagos to Ota) and section II (Ota to Abeokuta).

References 

Highways in Nigeria
Transport in Lagos